Mani Sharma (born Yanamandra Venkata Subrahmanya Sharma; 11 July 1964) is an Indian composer, multi-instrumentalist, and music producer known for his works primarily in the Telugu and Tamil cinema along with Kannada and Hindi films. He is a recipient of two state Nandi Awards, three Filmfare Awards South, and three Mirchi Music Awards South for Best Music Direction. His works are noted for integrating Indian classical music with electronic music, world music and traditional orchestra. He is often referred to as Melody Brahma and Swara Bramha for his melodious tunes.

Early life 
Mani Sharma was born as Yanamandra Venkata Subrahmanya Sharma on 11 July 1964 in Machilipatnam, Andhra Pradesh.

Career 
He has recorded several albums in his frequent collaborations with Chiranjeevi, Nandamuri Bala Krishna, Nagarjuna, Daggubati Venkatesh, Jr NTR, Mahesh Babu, Pawan Kalyan, Vijay, Allu Arjun, Prabhas and Ram Charan.
In his early days he worked as a programmer under many music composers namely S. Rajeswara Rao, Chakravarti, Ramesh Naidu, Ilaiyaraja, Raj–Koti, M. M. Keeravani. 
Ram Gopal Varma recognised his talent and gave hime the opportunity to work in his films, Raathri and Antham, in which he composed the entire background score of the films, apart from composing 1 song in Antham. Choodalani Vundi is the first film, where he composed all the songs. Producer Ashwini Dutt introduced him as a full-time music composer and later went on to work with him for many films.

Many music composers such as S. Thaman, Devi Sri Prasad, Harris Jayaraj worked under him in their early days.

Discography

Telugu

Tamil

Kannada

Hindi

Background score only

Television
 2007 Suriya

Other works

Awards
Nandi Awards
1998: Best Music Director – Choodalani Vundi

2003: Best Music Director – Okkadu

Filmfare Awards South
1998: Best Music Director – Telugu – ChoodalanI Vundi

2000: Best Music Director – Telugu – Chiru Navvutho

2003: Best Music Director – Telugu – Okkadu

References

External links 

Living people
Telugu people
Filmfare Awards South winners
Musicians from Andhra Pradesh
Kannada film score composers
Tamil film score composers
Telugu film score composers
Musicians from Chennai
20th-century Indian composers
21st-century Indian composers
Indian male playback singers
Indian male composers
Indian multi-instrumentalists
People from Andhra Pradesh
People from Krishna district
1964 births
20th-century Indian male singers
20th-century Indian singers
21st-century Indian male singers
21st-century Indian singers
People from Machilipatnam